Sharon Fichman and Sun Shengnan were the defending champions, but Sun decided not to participate this year.

Fichman partnered with Marie-Ève Pelletier and successfully defended her title, defeating Shuko Aoyama and Miki Miyamura 4–6, 7–5, [10–4] in the final.

Seeds

Draw

References
Main Draw

Challenger Banque Nationale de Granby
Challenger de Granby